Game of Assassins is a horror film directed by Matt Eskandari. The film was originally named The Gauntlet for the plot of the film.

Cast
Warren Kole as David Hellar
Bai Ling as Kim Lee
Jaime Ray Newman as Emma
Dustin Nguyen as in-Soo
Nick Lane as Tyler
Jude Ciccolella as William Hellar

Awards
It won the 2014 award for best horror film at the Indie Film Festival.

References

External links
 

2013 horror films
2013 films
Films directed by Matt Eskandari
2010s English-language films